The railways in Germany use several abbreviations to differentiate between various types of stations, stops, railway facilities and other places of rail service.

Places with a set of points
  –  (railway station), defined as a place where trains may start, terminate, stop, overtake, meet or change directions, and that has at least one set of points. It can be additionally named after its purpose:
  – , the main or central station of a town or city. Also the only abbreviation commonly found on station timetables and signs.
  –  (passenger station), usually used to differentiate in places that have several types of stations, but only one passenger station.
  –  (long distance station)
  –  (freight station)
  – , a station only for operational tasks like train overtakes.
  –  (marshalling yard)
  –  (transshipment station)
  – , a station serving a power plant.
  –  (mail station)
  –  (a junction without platforms)
  –  (crossover)
  –  (industrial siding outside station limits), trains using the  must not be passed by trains running on the main line.

Places without a set of points
Defined as a place where trains can stop, start or terminate, but which has no sets of points in the vicinity.
  –  (block post), a signal box outside station limits, where there is a long distance between stations and/or junctions/crossovers, with just one signal in each direction, to allow more trains following each other (only called  if it is staffed, otherwise it is called  –  (automatic block post)).
  – , a signal box outside station limits which protects rail operation at danger spots like moveable bridges with its signals.

Other railway facilities
  –  (bus stop)
  –  (office of the staff, locomotive depot; old/colloquial abbreviation:  for )
  –  (head office of computer-based interlocking)
  – , border to another railway infrastructure manager (domestic and foreign).
  – , border between German federated states.
  – , neutral section in an overhead line to separate two electrical supplies.
  –  (ship dock)
  – , change of VzG line.
  –  (filling stations)
  –  (traction substation)

Classification of railway facilities
Railway facilities in Germany are divided into three categories:
  (railway facilities of the stations): e.g. station buildings, platforms, loading docks, signal boxes, goods sheds
  (other railway facilities): e.g. electrical substations, depots, repair shops

See also
List of Deutsche Bahn station codes
German railway station categories

References

 
Railway depots in Germany